Club Balonmano Alicante or Club Balonmano Calpisa was a Spanish handball team based in Alicante, Spain, that dominated the Spanish league along four years and reached four championships and three Spanish cups.

Most of their players joined the national side of Spain and sometimes there were 6 or 7 Calpisa members playing with Spain.

Club's name

Trophies

División de Honor: 4
Winners: 1974–75, 1975–76, 1976–77, 1977–78
Runners-Up: 1978–79, 1979–80
Copa del Rey (Spanish cup): 4
Winners: 1974–75,1975–76,1976–77,1979–80, (CB Tecnisán) 1985–86
Runners-Up: 1978–79
EHF Champions League:
Semi-Final 77–78 Lost in semifinal against Śląsk Wrocław.
EHF Cup Winners' Cup: 1
Winners: 1979–80
EHF Cup:
Runners-Up: (CB Tecnisa) 1985–86
 Double
 Winners (3): 1974–75, 1975–76, 1976–77

Notable players

Notables coaches
Miguel Roca
Pitiu Rochel
José Julio Espina
Santos Labaca
César Argilés
 Ivo Munitić

References

External links
Media reports 
El Calpisa sólo existirá mientras sea el mejor
Calpisa campeón de la Recopa
Barcelona, gran favorito; Atlético y Calpisa, aspirantes al título 80-81

Spanish handball clubs
Handball clubs established in 1945
Handball clubs disestablished in 1993
Defunct handball clubs
1945 establishments in Spain
1993 disestablishments in Spain
Sport in Alicante
Sports teams in the Valencian Community